is a passenger railway station on the Minato Line in the city of Hitachinaka, Ibaraki, Japan, operated by the third-sector railway operator Hitachinaka Seaside Railway. Built as an infill station, it serves a new school located near the station, named Minohama Gakuen. The station opened on 13 March 2021.

Lines

Station layout
The station, which is unstaffed, consists of a single side platform featuring fences to prevent passengers from falling onto the tracks.

History
The station was built concurrently with Minohama Gakuen ("Minohama School"), a nearby school for elementary through junior high students which formed as a merging of previous schools in Hitachinaka, Ibaraki. The name of the school and station originates from beaches on Isozaki which were named "Minohama" in Man'yōshū.

Subsidies for the station's construction were paid by JRTT. The name of the new station was formally unveiled on 26 May 2020. It opened in March 2021.

Surrounding area
Minohama School

Bus routes
Smile Aozora Bus
For Nakaminato Station
For Ajigaura Station

See also
 List of railway stations in Japan

References

External links
Minohama school
Official website

Railway stations in Ibaraki Prefecture
Railway stations in Japan opened in 2021
Hitachinaka, Ibaraki